Melrose High School is a high school located at 546 5th Ave NE, Melrose, Minnesota, United States.

Notable alumni
 Blake Elliott - Winner of the 2003 Gagliardi Trophy for academic and football excellence.
 Matt Herkenhoff - Former professional football player.
 Mark Olberding - Former professional basketball player.
 Mitch Clem - Cartoonist, Creator of Nothing Nice to Say.
 Amanda Smock - competed in the 2012 Summer Olympics as an American Triple Jumper; she grew up in Melrose.
 Alan Welle - Minnesota state legislator and lawyer

References

External links
 

Schools in Stearns County, Minnesota
Public high schools in Minnesota